Harpalus kibonoti is a species of ground beetle in the subfamily Harpalinae. It was described by Alluaud in 1926.

References

kibonoti
Beetles described in 1926